Orlov is a rural locality (a khutor) in Alexeyevsky District, Belgorod Oblast, Russia. The population was 7 as of 2010. There is 1 street.

Geography 
Orlov is located 13 km south of Alexeyevka (the district's administrative centre) by road. Seroshtanov is the nearest rural locality.

References 

Rural localities in Alexeyevsky District, Belgorod Oblast
Biryuchensky Uyezd